Fridlund is a surname. Notable people with the surname include:

Emily Fridlund (born 1979/80), American novelist and academic
Malcolm Fridlund (born 1952), Swedish astronomer